Araxie Tovmasovna Babayan (arm., Բաբայան Արաքսի Թովմասի, 5 May 1906, Yerevan – 13 February 1993, Yerevan) was a Soviet and Armenian organic chemist. Honored Worker of Science and Technology of the Armenian SSR (1961) and Academician of the Academy of Sciences of Armenian SSR (1968).

Life and Work 
Araxie Babayan was born on 5 May 1906 in Yerevan. As a student of Yerevan State University, Babayan worked in the chemical laboratory, performing demonstrative experiments of her teacher Stepan Gambaryan - founder of the school of organic chemistry in Armenia. She graduated the agricultural faculty of the Yerevan State University in 1928. Starting from 1928 until 1958 Babayan worked in Yerevan veterinarian institute, and from 1935 – in Chemical institute of Armenian branch of the USSR Academy of Sciences.

In 1937 Babayan graduated from the chemical Faculty of the Yerevan Polytechnic Institute. She defended her dissertation in 1937, and her doctoral dissertation in 1945. Babayan's main research was devoted to amines and quaternary ammonium compounds. She established a number of new laws in the chemistry of quaternary ammonium compounds. Babayan proposed a method for synthesizing acetylene glycols, known in the chemical literature as Favorskii-Babayan reactions.

In 1949-1953 Babayan was a Deputy Director of Science of the Chemical Institute of the ArmFAN of the USSR.

In 1953, she discovered the catalytic action of ammonium salts for the alkylation reaction of organic acids.

In 1955-1957 Babayan was a head of the organic chemistry sector and from 1957 to 1993 head of the laboratory of the amino compounds of Academy of Sciences of Armenian SSR.

Since 1956, Babayan was a corresponding member, and since 1966 - an academician of the Academy of Sciences of the Armenian SSR. In 1961, Babayan was recognized as an Honored Scientist of the Armenian SSR.

From 1976 to 1983, Babayan was a chief editor of Armenian Chemical Journal.

She was a deputy of the Supreme Soviet of the II-IV convocations of the Armenian SSR.

Araxie Babayan died on 13 February 1993 in Yerevan and is buried at Nubarashen cemetery.

Awards 
 The Order of Friendship of Peoples
 The Order of the Red Banner of Labor
 The Order of the Badge of Honour

References 

1906 births
1993 deaths
Communist Party of the Soviet Union members
National Polytechnic University of Armenia alumni
Yerevan State University alumni
Recipients of the Order of Friendship of Peoples
Recipients of the Order of the Red Banner of Labour
People from Yerevan
Armenian chemists
Soviet women chemists
Soviet chemists
Soviet Armenians